The Alfbach is a , orographically right-bank tributary of the Prüm in the county of Bitburg-Prüm in the German state of Rhineland-Palatinate.

Geography

Course 
Its source lies on the northern slopes of the Schwarzer Mann about three kilometres northeast of Halenfeld in the municipality of Buchet.

The stream flows initially in a southwesterly direction to Halenfeld, where it collects its main tributary, the Donsbach, then turns south as far as Buchet, before changing direction to the southwest to continue through Bleialf. Near Großlangenfeld it changes its direction again to the south and, at the Hauscheid Mill (‘’Hauscheider Mühle’’) passes under the A 60 motorway.

Catchment 

Tributaries

See also 
List of rivers of Rhineland-Palatinate

References 

Rivers of Rhineland-Palatinate
Rivers of the Eifel
Bitburg-Prüm
Rivers of Germany